= Cosmin Ioniță =

Romanian professional footballer

Personal information
- Full name: Cosmin Ionuț Ioniță
- Date of birth: 27 January 2003 (age 23)
- Place of birth: Bucharest, Romania
- Positions: Full back; midfielder

Youth career
- Prosport Academy

Senior career*
Years	Team	Apps	(Gls)
2021–2022	Academica II Clinceni	7	(6)
2022–2022	Academica Clinceni	2	(0)
- * Club domestic league appearances and goals as of 30 April 2022

Cosmin Ionuț Ioniță (born 27 January 2003) is a Romanian professional footballer who plays as a full back or midfielder.
